Twilight Motel  is an album by the American banjoist Alison Brown, released in 1992. Brown used a 1938 Gibson banjo.

Production
Recorded in Nashville and in Berkeley, the album was produced by Mike Marshall. "Sweet Thames Flow Softly" is a cover of the Ewan MacColl song.

Reception 

The Baltimore Sun wrote that the album "touches on everything from slippery samba rhythms to flashy Scruggs-style picking." The Indianapolis Star concluded that "there's nothing bad on this disc, much that's good, but too much that's merely pleasant, veering close to 'easy listening'." Stereo Review noted that "Brown never wanders as far into space-grass territory as Bela Fleck, but her artistic vision, while less flashy, is no less profound."

In his AllMusic review, music critic Michael McCall called the album "jazzier, yet also more relaxed, than her debut."

Track listing 
All compositions by Alison Brown unless otherwise noted
 "First Light" – 5:17
 "Lorelei" – 4:36
 "Twilight Motel" – 3:45
 "Blue Marlin" – 4:40
 "Saint Geneviéve" – 4:02
 "Gods of Brazil" – 4:29
 "Shoot The Dog" – 3:25
 "Pelican Bay" – 3:12
 "Chicken Road" – 4:25
 "Sweet Thames Flow Softly (MacCall, MacColl)" – 5:24

Personnel
 Alison Brown – banjo, guitar
 Roy Huskey Jr. – bass
 Stuart Duncan – violin
 Matt Eakle – flute
 Jerry Douglas – dobro
 Darol Anger – violin
 Mike Marshall – guitar, mandolin
 Todd Philips – bass
 Mark Schatz – banjo, bass
 Scott Nygaard – guitar
 Maura O'Conell – vocals
 Tony Rice – guitar
 Michael Spiro – percussion
 Paul VanWageningen – drums
 Garry West – bass
 Kristin Wilkinson – viola
 Andrea Zonn - violin
 David Hoffner – piano, keyboards
 Tom Miller – drums, steel pan
 John Catchings – violoncello

References

Alison Brown albums
1992 albums
Vanguard Records albums